Common names: Tzotzil montane pitviper.

Cerrophidion tzotzilorum is a venomous pit viper species which is native to southern Mexico. There are no subspecies that are recognized as being valid.

Etymology
The specific name, tzotzilorum (Latin genitive plural), is in honor of the Tzotzil people.

Description
C. tzotzilorum is terrestrial and moderately stout. Adults probably do not exceed  in total length (including tail).

Geographic range
C. tzotzilorum is found in the Meseta Central of Chiapas, Mexico. The type locality given is "10.9 km   Jiji ESE San Cristobal de Las Casas, Chiapas, Mexico, elevation ".

Habitat
The preferred natural habitat of C. tzotzilorum is forest.

Diet
C. tzotzilorum is known to prey upon orthopterans and lizards.

Reproduction
C. tzotzilorum is viviparous.

Conservation status
The species C. tzotzilorum is classified as Least Concern (LC) on the IUCN Red List of Threatened Species (v3.1, 2001). Species are listed as such due to their wide distribution, presumed large population, or because it is unlikely to be declining fast enough to qualify for listing in a more threatened category. The population trend is stable. Year assessed: 2007.

References

Further reading
Campbell JA (1985). "A New Species of Highland Pitviper of the Genus Bothrops from Southern Mexico". Journal of Herpetology 19 (1): 48-54. (Bothrops tzotzilorum, new species).
Heimes P (2016). Snakes of Mexico: Herpetofauna Mexicana Vol I. Frankfurt am Main, Germany: Edition Chimaira. 572 pp. .
Schramer TD, Kalki Y, West TR, Baena-Bejarano N, Wylie DB (2019). "Natural History Notes: CERROPHIDION TZOTZILORUM (Tzotzil Montane Pitviper). DIET". Herpetological Review 50 (1): 151–152.

Crotalinae
Reptiles described in 1985
Taxa named by Jonathan A. Campbell
Snakes of North America
Endemic reptiles of Mexico